The 1992/93 FIS Ski Flying World Cup was the 3rd official World Cup season in ski flying awarded with small crystal globe as the subdiscipline of FIS Ski Jumping World Cup.

Calendar

Men

Standings 
Points were for the last time distributed by original old scoring system.

Ski Flying

Nations Cup unofficial

References 

World cup
FIS Ski Flying World Cup